Cadenza is an improvised or written-out ornamental passage in music played or sung by a soloist or soloists.

Cadenza may also refer to:

 Cadenza (album), an album by the British band Dutch Uncles.
 Cadenza (choir), a mixed-voice chamber choir based in Edinburgh, founded in 1992.
 Cadenza (University of Cambridge), a mixed a cappella choir at Cambridge University, founded in 1997.
 Cadenza Interactive, developer of the game Sol Survivor.
 Cadenza Pianos - a piano manufacturer specialising at installing outdoor pianos.
 Kia Cadenza, a car.
 Maestro Cadenza a character in the 2017 film adaptation of Beauty and the Beast.
 The Cadenza, a magazine from the late 19th and early 20th Centuries, devoted to the banjo, mandolin and guitar.
 Mi Amore Cadenza, royal name for Princess Cadance, a character in My Little Pony: Friendship is Magic.

See also
 Cadence (disambiguation)
 Credenza